Angels' Alley is a 1948 comedy film directed by William Beaudine and starring The Bowery Boys.  It is the ninth film in the series and the first one without Bobby Jordan.

Plot
Slip's cousin Jimmy is released from prison for good behavior and comes to live with him and his mother.  Unfortunately the only job he can get is stealing cars for a local mobster, Tony Locarno.  Slip learns about this and sets out to stop Jimmy from ruining his life.  He follows Jimmy to a warehouse that Jimmy is robbing and gets knocked unconscious and is caught by the police.  Father O'Hanlon steps in and helps Slip from going to jail.

Jimmy is impressed with Slip's actions and vows to go clean.  Slip, meanwhile, wants to put Tony behind bars so he and the rest of the boys join Tony's gang and steals cars in an effort to set him up.  Slip steals the mayor's car and Sach steals a police car...leading the real police to arrive on the scene in time to catch Tony and the rest of the gang.  Slip takes the credit for wrapping it up, and Sach is shocked that Slip is taking credit from him and tells him, "This is the last time I make a movie with you!"

Cast

The Bowery Boys
 Leo Gorcey as Terrance Aloysius 'Slip' Mahoney
 Huntz Hall as Horace Debussy 'Sach' Jones
 William Benedict as Whitey
 David Gorcey as Chuck

Remaining cast
 Gabriel Dell as Ricky Moreno
 Frankie Darro as Jimmy
 Nestor Paiva as Tony 'Piggy' Locarno
 Nelson Leigh as Father O'Hanlon
 Rosemary La Planche as Daisy Harris
 Bennie Bartlett as Harry 'Jag' Harmon
 Buddy Gorman as Andrew T. Miller

Production
Angels' Alley is the only Bowery Boys films in which Gabriel Dell is given a different character name. Louie (Bernard Gorcey) is absent from the film. However, Louie's Sweet Shop is mentioned by 'Sach' at least once in the film.

Angels' Alley is Bennie Bartlett's first Bowery Boys film. It wouldn't be until the next film in the series in which Bartlett would play his usual character of "Butch Williams."

Rosemary LaPlanche, who stars as Daisy, was Miss America 1941 after having been pageant runner-up in 1940.

Home media
Warner Archives released the film on made-to-order DVD in the United States as part of "The Bowery Boys, Volume Three" on October 1, 2013.

References

External links
 
 
 
 

1948 films
Bowery Boys films
1940s English-language films
Monogram Pictures films
Films directed by William Beaudine
American comedy films
1948 comedy films
American black-and-white films
1940s American films